LeRoy and Pictet was a co-operative company which recruited Germans to settle in Russia in the 18th century, under commission by Tsarina Catherine the Great.

The company was formed by le Roy, a Frenchman, Pictet, a Swiss from Geneva, and Sonntag, a German. There were two other corporations active in the field of recruiting settlers to Russia, one formed by the Frenchman Baron Caneu de Beauregard with Major Otto Friedrich of Monjou and the other, with no independent funding, by Jean de Boffe, Meusnier de Precour, and Quentin Benjamin Coulhette d'Hautervive.

To settlers wearied by wars and economic crises, Catherine promised freedom of religion, exemptions from taxes and military service, and the right to dispose of their land as they wished. Thousands of German craftsmen and farmers responded to these recruitment efforts and founded 103 German villages on both sides of the Volga; they are thus known as the Volga Germans. Le Roy and Pictet established 25 colonies comprising 1,530 families with 5,339 people, along the Volga south of Saratov and to the east on its left tributaries the Karaman and Tarlyk, for example the colony of Lauwe, now Yablonovka, founded as a Lutheran colony on 19 August 1767. Le Roy and Pictet later became managers of the colonies.

References

Further reading
Saratovskaya oblast'. Administrativno-territorial'noe delenie na 1 janvarya 1970 goda. Saratov: Privolžskoe knižnoe izdatel'stvo, 1970 
Igor Plewe. Einwanderung in das Wolgagebiet 1764–1767. Göttingen: Nordost-Institut 
Volume 1. Kolonien Anton - Franzosen. 1999. .
Volume 2. Kolonien Galka - Kutter. 2001. .
Volume 3. Kolonien Laub - Preuss. 2005. .
Volume 4. Reinhardt - Warenburg. 2008. .
Karl Stumpp. The Emigration from Germany to Russia in the Years 1763 to 1862.  Self-published: Tübingen, 1972.
Adam Geisinger. From Catherine to Khrushchev: the story of Russia's Germans. Winnipeg: Marian Press, 1974. (London: American Historical Society of Germans from Russia 1993)
Gottlieb Beratz. The German Colonies on the Lower Volga. Lincoln, Nebraska: American Historical Society of Germans from Russia, 1991. .

External links
Gazetteer of Volga German colonies, The Center for Volga German Studies, Concordia University (Oregon)
Geschichte der Russlanddeutschen 
Tzarina Catherine II's Declaration Regarding the Settlement of Foreigners of 22 July 1763, at wolgadeutsche.net (facsimile) 
Economic and Administrative Map of the Autonomous Republic of Volga Germans in 1938, at wolgadeutsche.net 
"Die Lauwe Lampe", historical newsletter published by Bernice Geringer Madden, at Germans from Russia Heritage Society

Volga German people
Human migration
History of ethnic groups in Russia
Russian Empire